Daniela Alexandra Arias Rojas (born 31 August 1994) is a Colombian footballer who plays as a defender for Liga MX Femenil club CF Pachuca and the Colombia women's national team.

Football Career Transfers and Statistics 
We are going to show you the list of football clubs and seasons in which Daniela Alexandra Arias Rojas has played. It includes the total number of appearance (caps), substitution details, goals, yellow and red cards stats.

References

External links
 
 
 
 

1994 births
Living people
People from Bucaramanga
Sportspeople from Santander Department
Colombian women's footballers
Women's association football defenders
Atlético Bucaramanga footballers
Independiente Medellín footballers
América de Cali (women) players
C.F. Pachuca (women) footballers
Liga MX Femenil players
Colombia women's international footballers
Footballers at the 2019 Pan American Games
Medalists at the 2019 Pan American Games
Pan American Games medalists in football
Pan American Games gold medalists for Colombia
Colombian expatriate women's footballers
Colombian expatriate sportspeople in Mexico
Expatriate women's footballers in Mexico
21st-century Colombian women